Kay Coles James (born June 1, 1949) is an American public official who has served as secretary of the Commonwealth of Virginia since January 2022, and as the director for the United States Office of Personnel Management under President George W. Bush from 2001 to 2005.  Previous to the OPM appointment, she served as Virginia Secretary of Health and Human Resources under then-Governor George Allen and was the dean of Regent University's government school. She is the president and founder of the Gloucester Institute, a leadership training center for young African Americans.

On December 19, 2017, she was named president of the Heritage Foundation, an influential conservative think tank. She is the first African-American and the first woman to hold that position. On March 22, 2021, she announced she was resigning as President.

Early life and education
James' mother was on government welfare for at least some of James' youth. She was raised in the inner city of Richmond, Virginia.

James attended John Marshall High School in Richmond, Virginia. A graduate of Hampton University, James is the recipient of numerous honorary degrees, most recently the Doctor of Laws Degree from Pepperdine University. James is the recipient the University of Virginia's Publius Award for Public Service, and the Spirit of Democracy Award for Public Policy Leadership from the National Coalition on Black Civic Participation.

As a 1994 graduation speaker at Hampton University, James said, "[The United States is] experiencing cultural AIDS. We as a country have been the victims of an immune system that has broken down. It's gone."

Early career

James has served on the Fairfax County School Board and the Virginia Board of Education, and on the board of the conservative evangelical Focus on the Family. She also was Senior Vice President of the Family Research Council, the conservative, Christian right group and lobbying organization. She has also served as Executive Vice-President and Chief Operating Officer for One to One Partnership, a national umbrella organization for mentoring programs.

She was appointed by President Ronald Reagan and reappointed by President George H. W. Bush as member of the National Commission on Children, an advisory body on children issues.  She served under President George H. W. Bush as Associate Director of the White House Office of National Drug Control Policy and as Assistant Secretary for public affairs at the U.S. Department of Health and Human Services.

In the mid-1990s, James served as Dean of the Robertson School of Government at Regent University in Virginia Beach, Virginia. She also served as Convention Secretary for the 1996 Republican National Convention, which nominated Bob Dole for president.

Office of Personnel Management

James served as the director for the United States Office of Personnel Management from 2001 to 2005 in the George W. Bush administration.

Paul Krugman noted that Regent University boasted of 150 graduates working in the Bush administration and criticized James' tenure as the federal government's chief personnel officer when many of these hires occurred. Boston Globe, journalist Charlie Savage wrote that previous to James' work as director of OPM, "veteran civil servants screened applicants and recommended whom to hire, usually picking top students from elite schools." Noting that Regent University is ranked a "tier four" school by U.S. News & World Report, the lowest score and essentially a tie for 136th place, Savage said James' changes resulted in lawyers with more conservative credentials, less prior experience in civil rights law and the decline of the average ranking of the law school attended by the applicants. In addition to Savage, other journalists made similar comments.

Later career

On November 4, 2009, Governor-elect Bob McDonnell of Virginia named her one of the co-chairs of his transition committee and subsequently appointed her as a member of Virginia Commonwealth University's governing body, the Board of Visitors.

On December 19, 2017, the Heritage Foundation, an influential conservative Washington, D.C.-based public policy research institute, announced that James would be its sixth president. She has served as a member of the Board of Trustees since 2005.

In 2018, she was nominated by President Trump to serve as one of two members of the Women's Suffrage Centennial Commission.

In March 2019, she was appointed to the Advanced Technology External Advisory Council (ATEAC), which was set up by Google to advise on the ethical implications of Artificial Intelligence. Her appointment proved controversial, with some employees of Google protesting. On April 5, 2019, it was reported that Google had disbanded the ATEAC after more than 2,380 employees at Google signed a petition asking that James be removed from it. The petition signers stated that "James' positions on transgender and immigrant rights should have disqualified her from weighing in on AI ethics."

James resigned from the Heritage Foundation in 2021.

Personal life and honors
James is the mother of three grown children and the wife of Charles E. James, Sr., who was the Deputy Assistant Secretary of the Office of Federal Contract Compliance Programs from 2001 to 2009 during the administration of George W. Bush.

In 2004, James was elected as a fellow of the National Academy of Public Administration.

James was named one of the Library of Virginia's Virginia Women in History in 2018.

Books

References

External links
Kay Coles James, President Heritage Foundation Biography
 Kay Cole James Gloucester Institute Biography
 
Interview with WORLD Magazine

1949 births
20th-century African-American people
20th-century African-American women
21st-century African-American people
21st-century African-American women
African-American people in Virginia politics
African-American state cabinet secretaries
African-American women in politics
American women academics
Directors of the United States Office of Personnel Management
Hampton University alumni
Leadership training
Living people
Politicians from Richmond, Virginia
Regent University faculty
Secretaries of the Commonwealth of Virginia
The Heritage Foundation
Women in Virginia politics
Virginia Republicans